Seminole County is the name of several counties in the United States:

Seminole County, Florida
Seminole County, Georgia
Seminole County, Oklahoma